Joan Cadden (born August 17, 1941, in Baltimore, Maryland) is a beautician and former politician from Maryland.

She was a Democratic member of the Maryland House of Delegates in District 31 from 1991 to 2007. Cadden was a member of the Anne Arundel County Board of Education from 1988 to 1990.

Cadden lost re-election in 2006.

Family
Cadden is married and has four children.

Residence
Cadden currently resides in Brooklyn Park, Maryland.

Education
From 1967 to 1969, Cadden attended Marinello Comer School of Cosmetology.

Professional experience
She was an owner and operator of her own cosmetology business.

Legislative notes

 voted for slots in 2005 (HB1361)

Election results
2006 Race for Maryland House of Delegates – 31st District
Voters to choose three:
{| class="wikitable"
|-
!Name
!Votes
!Percent
!Outcome
|-
|- 
|Steve Schuh, Rep.
|19,049
|  18.4%
|   Won
|-
|-
|Nicholaus R. Kipke, Rep.
|18,150
|  17.5%
|   Won
|-
|-
|Donald H. Dwyer, Jr., Rep.
|17,558
|  17.0%
|   Won
|-
|-
|Thomas J. Fleckenstein, Dem.
|16,654
|  16.1%
|   Lost
|-
|-
|Craig A. Reynolds, Dem.
|14,454
|  14.0%
|   Lost
|-
|-
|Joan Cadden, Dem.
|17,533
|  16.9%
|   Lost
|-
|Other Write-Ins
|75
|  0.1%
|   
|-
|}

2002 Race for Maryland House of Delegates – District 31
Voters to choose three:
{| class="wikitable"
|-
!Name
!Votes
!Percent
!Outcome
|-
|-
|John R. Leopold, Rep.
|24,937
|  24.31%
|   Won
|-
|-
|Joan Cadden, Dem.
|16,906
|  16.48%
|   Won
|-
|-
|Donald Dwyer, Jr., Rep.
|16,807
|  16.39%
|   Won
|-
|-
|Thomas R. Gardner, Rep.
|15,321
|  14.94%
|   Lost
|-
|-
|Mary Rosso, Dem.
|15,127
|  14.75%
|   Lost
|-
|-
|Thomas J. Fleckenstein, Dem.
|13,404
|  13.07%
|   Lost
|-
|}

1998 Race for Maryland House of Delegates – District 31
Voters to choose three:
{| class="wikitable"
|-
!Name
!Votes
!Percent
!Outcome
|-
|-
|John R. Leopold, Rep.
|21,632
|  23%
|   Won
|-
|-
|Joan Cadden, Dem.
|19,214
|  20%
|   Won
|-
|-
|Mary Rosso, Dem.
|15,372
|  16%
|   Won
|-
|-
|Victoria L. Schade, Rep.
|15,366
|  16%
|   Lost
|-
|-
|Robert Schaeffer, Rep.
|12,092
|  14%
|   Lost
|-
|-
|Thomas J. Fleckenstein, Dem.
|11,862
|  12%
|   Lost
|-
|}

1994 Race for Maryland House of Delegates – District 31
Voters to choose three:
{| class="wikitable"
|-
!Name
!Votes
!Percent
!Outcome
|-
|-
|John R. Leopold, Rep.
|19,960
|  24%
|   Won
|-
|-
|Joan Cadden, Dem.
|16,492
|  20%
|   Won
|-
|-
|Victoria L. Schade, Rep.
|14,801
|  18%
|   Won
|-
|-
|W. Ray Huff, Dem.
|14,203
|  17%
|   Lost
|-
|-
|C. Stokes Kolodziejski, Dem.
|13,176
|  16%
|   Lost
|-
|-
|Douglas Arnold, Rep.
|3,586
|  4%
|   Lost
|-
|}

References

External links
Del. Joan Cadden (MD Archives)

Living people
Democratic Party members of the Maryland House of Delegates
Women state legislators in Maryland
1941 births
Beauticians
21st-century American politicians
21st-century American women politicians
20th-century American politicians
20th-century American women politicians
School board members in Maryland